Agathotoma alcippe is a species of sea snail, a marine gastropod mollusk in the family Mangeliidae.

Description
The length of the shell varies between 5 mm and 11 mm.

The minute, whitish or pale brownish shell is subcylindrical and turreted. The protoconch has a projecting minute subglobular apex and contains about 1½ smooth whorls followed in the teleoconch by about 4½ sculptured whorls. The spiral sculpture consists of minute close-set threads covering uniformly the whole surface. The suture is distinct, appressed, the whorls shouldered immediately in front of it. The axial sculpture consists of (on the body whorl seven or eight) prominent, slightly protractively oblique ribs, with wider interspaces, extending over the whole whorl and prominent at the shoulder, but not continuous over the spire. The aperture is narrow. The outer lip is varicose, thick, striated in front, smooth within. The anal sulcus is conspicuous but not deep. The inner lip is smooth The siphonal canal is hardly differentiated.

Distribution
This marine species occurs off the Sea of Cortez, Western Mexico, and off the Galápagos Islands.

References

External links
  Bouchet P., Kantor Yu.I., Sysoev A. & Puillandre N. (2011) A new operational classification of the Conoidea. Journal of Molluscan Studies 77: 273-308. 
  Tucker, J.K. 2004 Catalog of recent and fossil turrids (Mollusca: Gastropoda). Zootaxa 682:1-1295.
 

alcippe
Gastropods described in 1918